Entochus was an Ancient Greek sculptor. His statues of Oceanus and Jupiter were in the collection of Asinius Pollio.

References

Footnotes

Ancient Greek sculptors